The Grammy Award for Best Progressive R&B Album is an honor presented at the Grammy Awards to recording artists for quality works on albums in the urban contemporary subgenre within the R&B field. Honors in several categories are presented at the ceremony annually by the Recording Academy of the United States to "honor artistic achievement, technical proficiency and overall excellence in the recording industry, without regard to album sales or chart position".

This category was one of the three newly created categories for the 55th Annual Grammy Awards as Best Urban Contemporary Album. In June 2020, the Recording Academy announced a renaming and redefining of the category. Its new name was Best Progressive R&B Album, with immediate effect, "to appropriately categorize and describe this subgenre. This change includes a more accurate definition to describe the merit or characteristics of music compositions or performances themselves within the genre of R&B."
Adding to this, the description of this category is now as follows: "[t]his category is intended to highlight albums that include the more progressive elements of R&B and may include samples and elements of hip-hop, rap, dance, and electronic music. It may also incorporate production elements found in pop, euro-pop, country, rock, folk, and alternative."

According to Recording Academy president Harvey Mason Jr. in the same press release, these changes reflected "the current state of the music industry and how it's evolved over the past 12 months." In the weeks leading up to this decision, the label "urban" to indicate music made by African American musicians, songwriters and producers had come under fire.

The award goes to the artist, producer and engineer/mixer, provided they are credited with more than 50% of playing time on the album. A producer and engineer with less than 50% of playing time, as well as the mastering engineer, can apply for a "Winners Certificate".

Controversies 
Many African American musicians have disputed the use of the term "urban contemporary", seen as a "catchall for music created by Black artists, regardless of genre". In a backstage interview given after his first Grammy win, artist Tyler, the Creator stated that "[i]t sucks that whenever we — and I mean guys that look like me — do anything that's genre-bending or that's anything, they always put it in a rap or urban category", adding that "I don't like that 'urban' word — it's just a politically correct way to say the n-word to me".

Recipients 

 Each year is linked to the article about the Grammy Awards held that year.

Artists with multiple wins
2 wins
 The Weeknd
 Beyoncé (one as The Carters)

Artists with multiple nominations

3 nominations
 Beyoncé (one as The Carters)
 Miguel
 Steve Lacy (one with The Internet)

2 nominations
 Jhené Aiko
 Chris Brown
 Chloe x Halle
 Robert Glasper
 Cory Henry
 Terrace Martin
 Rihanna
 The Weeknd

See also
Grammy Award for Best R&B Album
Progressive soul

References

External links 
Official site of the Grammy Awards

 
Urban Contemporary Album
Urban Contemporary Album
Album awards